Dutch Hollow is a valley in Shannon County the U.S. state of Missouri.

Dutch Hollow was named for the fact a large share of the first settlers were Germans (Deutsche).

References

Valleys of Shannon County, Missouri
Valleys of Missouri